Prabhas Sreenu is an Indian actor who has appeared in Telugu language films.

Career 
Sreenu has attached the name "Prabhas" as a prefix to his stage name, owing to his friendship with actor Prabhas. The pair had earlier been batchmates during their time at film institute, and after Prabhas had become an actor, Sreenu looked after his work. He continued to look after his work until Prabhas began to reduce his commitments to one film a year, which meant that Prabhas's uncles took over. He then worked as an actor, often playing negative and comedic roles in films.

Notable filmography

References

External links 

Indian male film actors
Male actors in Tamil cinema
Male actors in Telugu cinema
Living people
21st-century Indian male actors
Indian male comedians
Telugu comedians
Year of birth missing (living people)